The Miss West Virginia's Outstanding Teen competition is the pageant that selects the representative for the U.S. state of West Virginia in the Miss America's Outstanding Teen pageant. 

Civita Hooper of Colliers was crowned Miss West Virginia's Outstanding Teen on June 25, 2022 at the Airborne Event Center in Martinsburg, West Virginia. She competed for the title of Miss America's Outstanding Teen 2023 at the Hyatt Regency Dallas in Dallas, Texas on August 12, 2022.

Results summary
The following is a visual summary of the past results of Miss West Virginia's Outstanding Teen titleholders presented in the table below. The year in parentheses indicates year of the Miss America's Outstanding Teen competition in which the placement and/or award was garnered.

Placements

 Top 12: Sabrina Harrison (2018)

Awards

Other awards

 Community Service: Bethany Lojewski (2009), Isabel Raese (2012), Morgan Breeden (2013)
 Outstanding Academic Achievement: Veronika Ohlinger (2006)
 Outstanding Dance Talent: Braelynn Neely (2016), Sabrina Harrison (2018)
 Random Acts of Kindness: Sabrina Harrison (2018)

Winners

References

External links
 Official website

West Virginia
West Virginia culture
Women in West Virginia
Annual events in West Virginia